Kamil Semeniuk (born 16 July 1996) is a Polish professional volleyball player. He is a member of the Poland national team. A participant in the Olympic Games Tokyo 2020, silver medallist at the 2022 World Championship, and a two–time Champions League winner (2021, 2022). At the professional club level, he plays for Sir Safety Perugia.

Career

Clubs
In 2015, he joined the senior team of ZAKSA Kędzierzyn-Koźle, and made his debut in the PlusLiga. He won three Polish Championships, three Polish Cups, two Polish SuperCups and two CEV Champions League titles with the team. In 2022, he joined Sir Safety Perugia and won the Italian SuperCup with the team in the same year.

National team
In 2021, he made his debut in the Poland's national team in a match against Belgium. At the 2022 World Championship he won a silver medal with his national team, losing to Italy in four sets in the final.

Honours

Clubs
 CEV Champions League
  2020/2021 – with ZAKSA Kędzierzyn-Koźle
  2021/2022 – with ZAKSA Kędzierzyn-Koźle

 FIVB Club World Championship
  Betim 2022 – with Sir Safety Perugia

 National championships
 2015/2016  Polish Championship, with ZAKSA Kędzierzyn-Koźle
 2016/2017  Polish Cup, with ZAKSA Kędzierzyn-Koźle
 2016/2017  Polish Championship, with ZAKSA Kędzierzyn-Koźle
 2019/2020  Polish SuperCup, with ZAKSA Kędzierzyn-Koźle
 2020/2021  Polish SuperCup, with ZAKSA Kędzierzyn-Koźle
 2020/2021  Polish Cup, with ZAKSA Kędzierzyn-Koźle
 2021/2022  Polish Cup, with ZAKSA Kędzierzyn-Koźle
 2021/2022  Polish Championship, with ZAKSA Kędzierzyn-Koźle
 2022/2023  Italian Super Cup, with Sir Safety Susa Perugia

Universiade
 2019  Summer Universiade

Individual awards
 2021: Polish Cup – Most Valuable Player
 2022: CEV Champions League – Most Valuable Player
 2022: FIVB World Championship – Best Outside Spiker
 2022: CEV – Male Volleyball Player of the Year

References

External links

 
 
 
 Player profile at LegaVolley.it 
 Player profile at PlusLiga.pl 
 Player profile at Volleybox.net

1996 births
Living people
People from Kędzierzyn-Koźle
Sportspeople from Opole Voivodeship
Polish men's volleyball players
Olympic volleyball players of Poland
Volleyball players at the 2020 Summer Olympics
Universiade medalists in volleyball
Medalists at the 2019 Summer Universiade
Universiade silver medalists for Poland
Polish expatriate sportspeople in Italy
Expatriate volleyball players in Italy
ZAKSA Kędzierzyn-Koźle players
Warta Zawiercie players
Outside hitters
21st-century Polish people